Kang Hyung-gu (born ), better known as Kino, is a South Korean singer, songwriter, rapper, composer and dancer. He is best known as a member of the boy group Pentagon, which debuted in 2016 under Cube Entertainment. He releases solo music over on SoundCloud under the name Knnovation.

Name
At his group debut showcase, he explained the meaning behind 'Kino'. He said, “My real name is Kang Hyung-gu. I wanted to find a name that could show myself as a singer and in the team in the future, so Kino became it. 키노 is Kino, 'INO' is an acronym for innovation. K is from my original family name, Kang's K, Korea 'K'”.

Personal life 
Kino was born in Seongnam, South Korea, on January 27, 1998. He has a younger sister. He lived in the Philippines for 3 months when he was a kid. He can speak Korean, Japanese, and English. He graduated from Hanlim School of Performing Arts in 2017 and got admitted into Sejong University as a practical dance major through non-scheduled admission. He is named as the dance master in the group. He's friends with Park Ji-min of 15&, Woodz of UNIQ, Vernon of Seventeen, Nathan, and Hoho. Together they form a project group called M.O.L.A (Make Our Lives Awesome). Kino was a former Power Vocal and JYP Entertainment trainee before joining his current agency, Cube Entertainment. He also regularly uploads demos for other self produced tracks on his SoundCloud, "".

Career

Pre-debut: Pentagon Maker 
Before his K-pop debut, he was a member of a dance team called Urban Boyz.
He appeared in G.NA's "Secret" music video and promotional activities. He also appeared in Rain's "Rain Effect".

In 2016, he competed in the reality program Pentagon Maker.

2016–present: Debut with Pentagon and solo activities

With the released of "Young", Cube Entertainment confirmed Kino to debut with Pentagon. He helped create the choreography for their debut track, "Gorilla". Kino makes a cameo in the drama Hello, My Twenties! 2 with his bandmates as a member of Asgard.

In 2017, he helped choreograph the Pentagon songs "Like This" for the EP Demo_01 and "Runaway" for Demo_02, with the latter being alongside Jay Black. He also produced the song "Violet" in Demo_02, which has both a Korean and Japanese music video and later became the title track for their second Japanese mini album, Violet.

On July 14, 2018, Kino posted a video of himself doing the "In My Feelings Challenge". Being the first celebrity in South Korea to do the challenge, the clip went viral and the challenge gained popularity in the country. On July 17, he was cast with Gongchan of B1A4 and Yoo Seung-Woo as the MC for Bus King, a program where musicians surprise bus passengers by performing series of songs. M.O.L.A, a musical group consisting of Kino, Park Ji-min of 15&, Woodz of UNIQ, Vernon of Seventeen, and Nathan, released an unofficial song "Chillin" on SoundCloud. In September, he was featured on Park Ji-min's "PUTP" (Pick Up The Phone) alongside M.O.L.A members Woodz and Nathan. The song was released on Jimin's second mini album jiminxjamie. Later that month, he wrote the song "Crossroad" for Jung Dong-ha's first full album of the same name. In November, Kino participated in labelmate A Train To Autumn's debut track "That Season You Were In" and "Bad" by KRIZ featuring Woodz. In late December, he wrote Jisu's debut single "Dear Dawn".

In January 2019, he co-wrote the lyrics for M.FECT's "Designer". On March 11, he contributed in writing and composing "Always Difficult Always Beautiful", for Wooseok on Wooseok x Kuanlin's debut extended play 9801. The song was inspired by the episode "San Junipero" from season three of British anthology series Black Mirror. That same month, Pentagon held the comeback showcase for their eight mini album Genie:us, which contained three songs produced by Kino: "Lost Paradise", "Spring Snow", and "Round 1". Kino participated in all scheduled activities with the exception of performances due to an ankle injury he suffered in January. Pentagon continued promoting with "Spring Snow", and he was able to participate in the promotions for a week. On April 30, he co-wrote, co-produced, and was featured on KRIZ's "1 Sided Love". On September 1, he was featured on KRIZ's track "Hard to Love". He produced "What's Going On With Me?" (이제와 무슨 소용 있겠냐고) by Han Seung-hee, which was released on October 30.

In 2020, Kino debuted as a radio host on the Casper Radio's radio program, Kino's KiSingBooth (Korean: 키Sing부스). With the release of Pentagon's first studio album Universe: The Black Hall on February 12, Kino co-composed "Die for You" with Nathan. He wrote the song using Harley Quinn from the movie Suicide Squad as an inspiration. In June 2020, he co-produced "Shine Bright" by Lee Soo-young, which was the fourth OST for the comedy-drama Kkondae Intern. On September 16, Kino produced the Pentagon song "Twenty-Twenty", which was the first OST for the web drama Twenty-Twenty. He and bandmate Hongseok later made a cameo in the drama a month later. On October 12, Pentagon released their 10th mini album We:th, for which he produced two songs: "Beautiful Goodbye" and "Paradise". Kino shared that the online album art cover was drawn by him as a gift to Pentagon's leader Hui. This marks Kino's "debut drawing". He also drew the teaser image and the inside pages of the album. In November, Kino participated as the first artist in Unordinary Sunday's project album with the song "Poison". The jazz song describes one's conflicted feelings of leaving behind a toxic person even though he is still in love.

In March 2021, Kino began hosting the DIVE Studios podcast Unboxing alongside Astro's Jinjin. He participated in Unordinary Sunday's second project album alongside Yumin with the song "Sunflower", released on May 21. On June 19, Kino was featured on Davii's single "Don't play me love". He wrote and co-produced A.C.E's song "Atlantis" from their EP Siren:Dawn, released on June 23. Days later, he was officially announced as an MC for the FashionN original program titled Follow Me - True to your taste, a beauty program that presents various ways to become pretty, covering fashion, beauty and life.

On August 9, 2022, Kino released the special single "Pose".

Discography

Other songs

Choreography

Filmography

Television series

Web dramas

Variety shows

Radio

Podcast

References

External links
 

1998 births
Living people
South Korean pop singers
21st-century South Korean male singers
South Korean male idols
Cube Entertainment artists
Pentagon (South Korean band) members
Hanlim Multi Art School alumni
South Korean male singer-songwriters
Kino (singer)
People from Seongnam